was a Japanese girl group formed by Avex Pictures in 2012. The group debuted through the Pretty Rhythm anime series, where they hosted the live-action segments in each episode and later released their first song, "Everybody's Gonna Be Happy", on 16 March 2012 as one of the ending theme songs to Pretty Rhythm: Aurora Dream. Fictionalized versions of themselves appeared as the main cast of Pretty Rhythm: Dear My Future to promote their activities.

After the end of the Pretty Rhythm series, Prizmmy continued to perform theme songs to the series' successor, PriPara, joined with the trainee group Prism Mates as back-up performers. As a collective group, they performed under the name Prism Box. After PriPara ended, the group disbanded on 31 March 2017.

History

2011-2012: Debut
In 2011, Mia Kusakabe, Reina Kubo and Karin Takahashi were in a pre-debut trainee group called Prism Mates, where they would participate in the "Pretty Rhythm Studio" live-action segments at the end of each episode in Pretty Rhythm: Aurora Dream. The segments followed them training in dance, singing, and fashion sense for their debut, much like the main characters in the show. The members were all students from Avex Dance Master.

In 2012, Kusakabe, Kubo, and Takahashi debuted under the name Prizmmy, along with a fourth member, Ayami Sema. Sema was the winner of the Pretty Rhythm Award at the Kiratto Entertainment Challenge Contest 2011 Summer, who had also previously worked as an exclusive model for KiraPichi. Their debut single, "Everybody's Gonna Be Happy", was released on 16 March 2012 as the fourth ending theme song for Pretty Rhythm: Aurora Dream; the B-side, "Popple Heart", used in a commercial for the Popple Heart toy from Takara Tomy.

On 25 April 2012, Prizmmy released their second and third singles: "Dear My Future" and "My Transform", as the opening and ending theme songs to Pretty Rhythm: Dear My Future. "Party Driver", a B-side from "Dear My Future", was featured in the series as an insert song. Fictionalized versions of the members became the main cast of the series, while Prism Mates had reformed with a new generation of trainees to accompany Prizmmy in hosting the "Pretty Rhythm Studio" segments and appearing in their music videos as back-up dancers. On 29 August 2012, Prizmmy released their fourth single, "Brand New World!", as the second opening theme song to Pretty Rhythm: Dear My Future. Following the release, on 21 November 2012, they released their fifth single, "Body Rock", as the third ending theme song to Pretty Rhythm: Dear My Future.

2013-2014: Prism Mates and Prism Box projects

On 20 February 2013, Prizmmy released their sixth single, "Pump it Up!", which was used as the fourth opening theme song for Pretty Rhythm: Dear My Future. For Pretty Rhythm: Rainbow Live, the third Pretty Rhythm anime series, Prizmmy collaborated with Prism Mates under the group name Prism Box; they released the song "RainBow × RainBow" as the first ending theme song on 24 April 2013. Prizmmy covered several songs by TRF as a collaboration between Avex Entertainment and the Pretty Rhythm series to honor TRF's 20th anniversary. "Boy Meets Girl" was released on 22 May 2013 as the first opening theme song to Pretty Rhythm: Rainbow Live. "EZ Do Dance" was released on 24 July 2013 as the second opening theme song, and "Crazy Gonna Crazy" was released on 30 October 2013 as the third opening theme song. Prizmmy also released their first studio album, Take Off!, on 24 July 2013, which contained original songs along with a solo by Karin Takahashi.

Near the end of the Pretty Rhythm: Rainbow Live, Prizmmy released "Butterfly Effect" as their tenth single and as the fourth opening theme song on 5 February 2014; the B-side, "Wanda", was used in an advertisement for Steppy. Grouped together with Prism Mates as Prism Box, they released the song "Happy Star Restaurant" as the final ending theme song on 26 February 2014. On 30 March 2014, Sema announced at the end of the final episode of Pretty Rhythm: Rainbow Live that she was leaving Prizmmy. She was replaced by Prism Mates member Hina Miyazaki on 5 April 2014.

2014-2017: Final years and disbandment

In April 2014, Prizmmy and Prism Mates performed the ending theme song to the film Panpaka Pants The Movie: Secret of the Bananan Kingdom as Prism Box. On 25 June 2014, Prizmmy released their second studio album, Music Goes On, which also included songs performed by Prism Mates, as well as their digital singles released between 2013 and 2014. On 17 September 2014, Prizmmy released "Jumpin'! Dancin'!" as the first ending theme song to PriPara. On 26 November 2014, Prism Box released the single "Kiraki-Runway" as the third ending theme to PriPara.

On 18 February 2015, Prizmmy released the single "I Just Wanna Be With You (Virtual to Real no Hazama)" as the third ending theme song to PriPara. In the summer of 2015, Prizmmy participated in the Tokyo Idol Festival.

On 24 February 2016, Prizmmy released the song "Love Trooper" as an mini album, with the title track as an ending theme song to PriPara. On 9 December 2016, Prizmmy announced on a Showroom live-stream that they will disband on 31 March 2017, along with Prism Mates. After releasing their final album, Prizmmy The Best! on 22 February 2017, they held their final concert on 30 March 2017, "Hello My Future."

Members 

 Mia Kusakabe
 Reina Kubo
 Karin Takahashi
  (former Prism Mates member, joined on 5 April 2014)
  (left on 30 March 2014)

Prism Mates

 was a pre-debut trainee group who accompanied Prizmmy as a supporting act. They appeared with Prizmmy in hosting the "Pretty Rhythm Studio" segments in Pretty Rhythm: Dear My Future and Pretty Rhythm: Rainbow Live. The members also appeared in their music videos as their back-up dancers. Prism Mates also made a cameo in episode 9 of Pretty Rhythm: Rainbow Live. At the time, the members' ages averaged around 11.2 years old.

From 2013 to 2014, members from Prism Mates released digital singles, which were later included on Prizmmy's second studio album, Music Goes On. Their first song as a group, "Zenshin Zenrei Go My Way!" was released on Prizmmy's mini album, Love Trooper. In 2015, a sub-unit consisting of Mirei Takahashi, Yuka Takayanagi, Momona Aoki, and Airi Hamamura called  released the single "Idol Kinryoku Lesson Go!" for PriPara. As a collective group, they released music with Prizmmy under the name Prism Box.

 
 
 
  (joined on 23 December 2013)
  (joined on 23 December 2013)
  (left on 2 May 2015)
  (left on 29 April 2016)
  (left on 29 April 2016)

Discography

Studio albums

Extended plays

Compilation albums

Singles

Prism Mates singles

Prism Box singles

Video albums

DVDs

Filmography

Television

Tours

Headlining
 Prizmmy: Grow Up Live Hyper! (2014)
 Prism Box Live Tour Virtual × Real (2015)
 Prizmmy & Prism Mates Nen Wasure Live: Overclock Live (2016)
 Hello My Future! (2017)

Concert participation
 Pretty Rhythm in Christmas (2012)
 Pretty Rhythm Dream Festival (2013)
 A-Nation Island (2013)
 Pretty Rhythm Christmas: Prism Stage (2013)
 Tokyo Idol Festival 2014 (2014)
 Tokyo Idol Festival 2015 (2015)
 Nendoroid 10th Anniversary Live (2016)

References

External links 
  

Japanese girl groups
Japanese pop music groups
Musical groups established in 2012
2012 establishments in Japan
Child musical groups
Avex Group artists
Musical groups from Tokyo
Pretty Rhythm